Gloria Tapia (born 5 March 1972) is a Swedish actress. She was nominated for the award for Best Actress at the 27th Guldbagge Awards for her role in Agnes Cecilia – en sällsam historia.

Selected filmography
 Agnes Cecilia – en sällsam historia (1991)

References

External links

1972 births
Living people
20th-century Swedish actresses
21st-century Swedish actresses
Swedish film actresses
Swedish television actresses
Place of birth missing (living people)